The KBO League Golden Glove Award is an award given out annually by the Korea Baseball Organization (KBO) to the best overall player at each position in the KBO League. It is also commonly known as the KBO Golden Gloves. The award was established in KBO League's inaugural year in 1982.

Selection format 
Each year, one award is given to the best player at each position, as voted by baseball writers, analysts and broadcasters. (In the KBO's first year, 1982, the award was given exclusively for defensive prowess, similar to the MLB Gold Glove Award). All outfielders are grouped for three outfielder awards and designated hitters have been included since 1984. League leaders in major offensive and pitching categories earn automatic nominations for the award. Other position players have to appear in a minimal number of defensive innings at the position, while starting pitchers have to appear in sufficient innings to qualify for the ERA title (i.e. 144 innings or average of 1 per game) to be nominated. Relievers can qualify by recording at least 10 wins, 30 saves or 30 holds.

Award winners

Records 

Most total awards:

 Lee Seung-yuop (Hangul: 이승엽; Hanja: 李承燁). 10 times (1B: 1997–2003 | DH: 2012, 2014–2015)
Yang Joon-hyuk (양준혁; 梁埈赫). 8 times (1B: 2004 | OF: 1996–1997, 2003 | DH: 1998, 2001, 2006–2007)
Han Dae-hwa (한대화; 韓大化). 8 times (3B: 1986–1991, 1993–1994)

Most awarded pitcher:

 Sun Dong-yol (선동열; 宣銅烈). 6 times (1986, 1988–1991, 1993)

Most awarded catcher:

Kim Dong-soo (김동수; 金東洙). 7 times (1990, 1993–1995, 1997, 1999, 2003)

Most awarded first baseman:

Kim Seong-han (김성한; 金城漢). 7 times (1985–1991)
Lee Seung-yuop (이승엽; 李承燁). 7 times (1997–2003)

Most awarded second baseman:

 Park Jeong-tae. 5 times (1991–1992, 1996, 1998–1999)

Most awarded third baseman:

 Han Dae-hwa (한대화; 韓大化). 8 times (1986–1991, 1993–1994)

Most awarded shortstop:

 Kim Jae-bak (김재박; 金在博). 5 times (1983–1986, 1989)
Park Jin-man (박진만; 朴鎮萬). 5 times (2000–2001, 2004, 2006–2007)

Most awarded outfielder:

Lee Byung-kyu (이병규; 李炳圭). 6 times (1997, 1999–2001, 2004–2005)

Most awarded designated hitter:
 Kim Ki-tai (김기태; 金杞泰). 4 times (1992–1994, 2004)
 Hong Sung-heon (홍성흔; 洪性炘). 4 times (2008–2011)

Foreign-born award winners 
Each KBO team is allowed to sign up to three foreign-born players (two pitchers and one position player). The following is a list of foreign players that have won the KBO Golden Gloves over the years:

Felix Jose (1999, outfielder)
Dan Rohrmeier (1999, designated hitter)
Tyrone Woods (2000, designated hitter)
Tilson Brito (2002, shortstop)
Cliff Brumbaugh (2004, outfielder)
 Jay Davis (2005, outfielder)
Larry Sutton (2005, outfielder)
Danny Rios (2007, pitcher)
Karim Garcia (2008, outfielder)
Aquilino Lopez (2009, pitcher)
Andy Van Hekken (2014, pitcher)
Eric Hacker (2015, pitcher)
Eric Thames (2015–2016, first baseman)
Yamaico Navarro (2015, second baseman)
Dustin Nippert (2016, pitcher)
Roger Bernadina (2017, outfielder)
Josh Lindblom (2018–2019, pitcher)
Mel Rojas Jr. (2019-2020 outfielder)
Jerry Sands (2019, outfielder)
Jose Miguel Fernandez (2019–2020, designated hitter)
Raúl Alcántara (2020, pitcher)
Ariel Miranda (2021, pitcher)

See also 

 List of MLB players from South Korea
 KBO posting system

References

External links
 KBO League official website

Golden Glove Award
1982 establishments in South Korea
Annual events in South Korea